Zhovtneve (October) is a common name for a populated settlement in Ukraine. All of those were or are to be renamed according to the law prohibiting names of Communist origin. It may refer to:

 Zhovtneve Air Base, near Volodymyr, Ukraine

Localities and subdivisions formerly named Zhovtneve
 Blahodatne, Novovolynsk Municipality, Volyn Oblast, Ukraine
 Myroliubiv, Luhyny Raion, Zhytomyr Oblast, Ukraine
 Vitovka Raion, Mykolaiv Oblast, Ukraine